The 2015–16 Second League (known as the Spor Toto 2. Lig for sponsorship reasons) is the third level in the Turkish football.

Teams 
Manisaspor, Bucaspor and Orduspor relegated from PTT First League.
Göztepe, Yeni Malatyaspor and 1461 Trabzon promoted to 2015–16 TFF First League.
Tuzlaspor, Eyüpspor, Anadolu Üsküdar 1908, İstanbulspor, Sivas Dört Eylül Belediyespor and Ankara Demirspor promoted from TFF Third League.
Turgutluspor, Körfez İskenderunspor, Ofspor, TKİ Tavşanlı Linyitspor, Gölbaşıspor, Birlik Nakliyat Düzyurtspor and Altay relegated to 2015–16 TFF Third League

Locations

White Group

League table

Red Group

League table

Promotion playoffs

Quarterfinals

|}

Semifinals

|}

Final

|}

See also 
 2015–16 Turkish Cup
 2015–16 Süper Lig
 2015–16 TFF First League
 2015–16 TFF Third League

References

External links
TFF 2.LIG

TFF Second League seasons
3
Turkey